Gailes is a suburb of Ipswich in the City of Ipswich, Queensland, Australia. In the  Gailes had a population of 1,828 people.

Geography 
The suburb is bounded to the north by the Ipswich Motorway and the Main Line railway and to the west by Woogaroo Creek, a tributary of the Brisbane River.

The land use is predominantly residential with a small amount of undeveloped bushland in the south-west of the locality.

History 

In 1823 explorer John Oxley named a local high point Dingo Hill which became the local name for the area. This led to a local railway siding to also be named Dingo Hill.

On 16 September 1925, the Dingo Hill railway siding was upgraded and renamedGailes railway station, after the Western Gailes Golf Club in Ayrshire, Scotland. The suburb of Gailes takes its name from the railway station. The name Gailes means "overgrown by bog-myrth".

Suburban boundary changes in 1986 resulted in the Gailes railway station now being within the suburb of Wacol in City of Brisbane. Similarly the hill Dingo Hill is now within the neighbouring suburb of Camira.

In January 2011 Gailes was flooded during the 2011 Queensland floods.

In the  Gailes had a population of 1,646 people.

In the  Gailes had a population of 1,828 people.

Transport
There is no railway station within the suburb of Gailes. The nearest railway stations are Goodna railway station and Gailes railway station, both of which provide regular Queensland Rail City network services to Brisbane, Ipswich and Rosewood via Ipswich.

Education 
There are no schools in Gailes. The nearest primary school is Camira State School in neighbouring Camira to the south. The nearest secondary schools are Bellbird Park State Secondary College in Bellbird Park to the south-west and Woodcrest State College in Springfield to the south.

Facilities 
Gailes Post Office is at Gailes Shopping Centre, 65 Old Logan Road.

Amenities 
There are a number of parks in the area, including:

 Fred Ferguson Park
 Knoblanche Park

 Lowry Park

 Martin Coogan Park

 Noble Park

References

External links

 

 
Suburbs of Ipswich, Queensland